Valdemir de Oliveira Soares (born 12 March 1997), known as Val is a Brazilian footballer who plays for Marítimo as a defensive midfielder, he can also play as a right-back.

Career statistics

Honours
Brasil de Pelotas
Taça Centenário: 2018

References

External links

1997 births
Living people
Brazilian footballers
Association football midfielders
Campeonato Brasileiro Série A players
Campeonato Brasileiro Série B players
Campeonato Brasileiro Série C players
Sport Club Internacional players
Grêmio Esportivo Brasil players
ABC Futebol Clube players
Botafogo Futebol Clube (SP) players
Coritiba Foot Ball Club players
C.S. Marítimo players
Sportspeople from Pará